Celina is a city in and the county seat of Mercer County, Ohio, United States about 58 miles northwest of Dayton. The population was 10,400 at the 2010 census.  Celina is situated on the northwestern shores of Grand Lake St. Marys.

History
James Watson Riley established Celina in 1834. The settlement was named after Salina, New York.

The town was hit by a deadly EF3 tornado on May 27, 2019.  Numerous homes, building, trees, and power lines and poles were damaged or destroyed. One person was killed and eight others were injured.

Geography
Celina is located at  (40.551459, -84.570057), at an elevation of 886 feet (270 m).

Demographics

At the 2000 census there were 10,303 people in 4,191 households, including 2,745 families, in the city.  The population density was 2,346.9 people per square mile (906.2/km).  There were 4,466 housing units at an average density of 1,017.3/sq mi (392.8/km).  The racial makeup of the city was 97.04% White, 0.18% African American, 0.37% Native American, 0.67% Asian, 0.02% Pacific Islander, 0.62% from other races, and 1.10% from two or more races. Hispanic or Latino of any race were 2.14%.

Of the 4,191 households 33.7% had children under the age of 18 living with them, 50.3% were married couples living together, 11.7% had a female householder with no husband present, and 34.5% were non-families. 30.5% of households were one person and 14.9% were one person aged 65 or older.  The average household size was 2.42 and the average family size was 3.04.

The age distribution was 27.2% under the age of 18, 9.0% from 18 to 24, 26.8% from 25 to 44, 21.0% from 45 to 64, and 16.0% 65 or older.  The median age was 36 years. For every 100 females, there were 91.5 males.  For every 100 females age 18 and over, there were 85.8 males.

The median household income was $36,057 and the median family income  was $44,901. Males had a median income of $35,467 versus $22,008 for females. The per capita income for the city was $18,200.  About 8.1% of families and 11.7% of the population were below the poverty line, including 16.7% of those under age 18 and 10.5% of those age 65 or over.

2010 census
At the 2010 census there were 10,400 people in 4,264 households, including 2,791 families, in the city.  The population density was 2,087.9 people per square mile (906.2/km).  There were 4,841 housing units at an average density of 1,017.3 per square mile (392.8/km).  The racial makeup of the city was 94.9% White, 0.5% African American, 0.4% Native American, 1.2% Asian, 0.4% Pacific Islander.  Hispanic or Latino of any race were 2.8%.

Of the 4,329 households 31.8% had children under the age of 18 living with them, 45.5% were married couples living together, 13.0% had a female householder with no husband present, and 35.5% were non-families. 30.7% of households were one person and 27.8% were one person aged 65 or older.  The average household size was 2.37 and the average family size was 2.94.

The age distribution was 27.9% under the age of 19, 24.4% from 20 to 39, 26.2% from 40 to 59, 15.5% from 60 to 79, and 6.1% who were 80 years of age or older.  The median age was 38.3 years.

Economy

Huffy Bicycle and Mersman Furniture formerly had manufacturing plants in Celina but have since closed.  Companies such as Celina Aluminum Precision Technology (a Honda supplier), Crown Equipment Corporation (located in Huffy's former location), and Reynolds and Reynolds are the largest manufacturing employers. Eighth Floor, LLC, Thieman Tailgates, McKirnan Brothers, Inc. and Celina Tent Inc. are also based out of Celina. Agriculture is a significant part of the economy, including soybeans, corn, and wheat.

Arts and culture

Freedom Days Picnic
Celina hosts the annual Freedom Days Picnic in early July in honor of American Independence.

Celina Lake Festival

During the last weekend in July, Celina hosts the annual Celina Lake Festival to celebrate Celina's history on Grand Lake St. Marys. The Lake Festival is host to one of the largest Amphicar gatherings in the world. The cars gather on Friday night for a "swim-in".

Mercer County Fair
During the second week in August, Celina is home to the Mercer County Fair and hosts many arts and crafts, livestock, food, rides, and the demolition derby.

Governor's Cup Regatta
Celina hosts the annual Governors Cup Regatta which features hydroplane racing on Grand Lake St. Marys.

Education

Public schools
Celina Public Schools belong to the Celina City School District. The district has three elementary schools, a middle school and a high school.

The district reorganized the grade locations for the 2014 school year. The schools include Celina Primary School (K-2), Celina Elementary School (3-4), Celina Intermediate Elementary School (5-6), Celina Middle School (7-8), and Celina High School (9-12). There is an alternative high school located at the Education Complex.

The Celina-Mercer County Head Start Program is for children in Pre-School.  There are two locations in the Celina district where Head Start is located:  The Celina City Schools Education Complex and the Celina City Schools Franklin Building.

There are Tri-Star classes located at the Celina High School, the Celina City Schools Education Complex, and the Franklin Building.

Colleges and universities
Wright State University's Lake Campus is located off State Route 703 on 600 Lake Campus Drive in Celina.
 Wright State University Lake Campus

Libraries
The Mercer County District Library's main library is located at 303 North Main Street in Celina. The district library also has branches in St. Henry, Mendon, and Chickasaw.

Media

Celina is served by a daily newspaper, The Daily Standard, first published in 1848.  It circulates about 10,000 copies a day.

Celina is also served by three local radio stations, WCSM AM and FM and WKKI FM.  WCSM-FM broadcasts at 96.7 and plays adult contemporary music.  WCSM-AM broadcasts at 1350 and features news, talk, and the Music of Your Life adult standards format.  WKKI broadcasts at 94.3 and plays rock.

Notable people
 Vera Barstow (1891–1975), violinist born in Celina
 Mike Bath (born 1977), American football player (1997–2000) and interim head coach (2013) at Miami University
 Galen Cisco, baseball player and coach. Resident of Celina after his career was over.
 Keith Faber (born 1966), 94th President of the Ohio Senate; [Ohio State Auditor]
 Tennyson Guyer (1912–1981), Mayor of Celina (1940–44); U.S. House or Representatives (1973–81)
 Frank Le Blond Kloeb (1890–1976), U.S. House of Representatives (1933–37)
 Charles Hubert Le Blond (1883–1958) 4th Roman Catholic Bishop of St. Joseph, Missouri (1933–56)
 Shelly Mars (born 1960), performance artist, actor, and printmaker
 Wendell Mobley, country music songwriter
 Jim Otis (born 1948), running back at Ohio State (1967–69), National Football League (1970–79); Pro Bowl (1975)
 Dan Pifer (born 1972), Head Football Coach at Olivet College
 Cody Reichard (born 1987), ice hockey player
 Keven Stammen (born 1985), poker player
 John W. Sweeterman (1907–1998) publisher of The Washington Post (1961–68)
 Jackie Tavener (1897–1969), shortstop in Major League Baseball (1921, 1925–29)
 William E. Tou Velle (1862–1951), U.S. House of Representatives (1907–11)
 Samuel J. Vining (1864–1914), Speaker of the Ohio House of Representatives (1911–13)
 Mike Wessel (born 1977), mixed martial arts fighter
 Mildred Wolfe (1912–2009), artist

References

External links

 City website
 Mercer County District Library

 
County seats in Ohio
Cities in Mercer County, Ohio
Populated places established in 1834
1834 establishments in Ohio
Cities in Ohio